All 80 seats in the General Assembly were up for election this year. In each Legislative district, there are two people elected; the top two winners in the general election are the ones sent to the Assembly. Typically, the two members of each party run as a team in each election. After the previous election, Democrats captured 48 seats while the Republicans won 32 seats. At the time of the general election, there were two vacancies: One in the 5th District resulting from Democrat Angel Fuentes's resignation on June 30, 2015, and one in the 24th District resulting from Republican Alison Littell McHose's resignation on October 17, 2015. 

Ultimately four Democrats defeated four incumbent Republicans leading to the Democrats controlling 52 of 80 seats in the 2016–17 Assembly session, the highest percentage they held since 1979. Democrats flipped both seats in the 11th district, and one each in the 16th and the 1st.

Overall results
Summary of the November 3, 2015 New Jersey General Assembly election results:

Summary of results by district

Close races 
Districts where the difference of total votes between the top-two parties was under 10%:

 
  gain D
 
  gain

List of races

Voters in each legislative district elect two members to the New Jersey General Assembly.

District 1 

|- style="background-color:#F6F6F6" 
! style="background-color: #3333FF" | 
| colspan="6" | One Democratic gain from Republican
|-

District 2 

|- style="background-color:#F6F6F6" 
! style="background-color: white" | 
| colspan="6" | One Democratic and one Republican hold
|-

District 3

District 4

District 5 

Incumbent Angel Fuentes originally ran in the Democratic primary but withdrew his candidacy in June 2015 when he became a deputy county clerk in Camden County. Fuentes and Marianne Holly Cass were replaced on the Democratic ballot by Arthur Barclay and Pat Jones and Ralph Williams was replaced by Keith Walker on the Republican ticket.

District 6 

Robert Esposito originally won a spot on the Republican ticket in the general election but was replaced on the ballot by Claire Gustafson.

District 7

District 8

District 9

District 10

District 11 

|- style="background-color:#F6F6F6" 
! style="background-color: #3333FF" | 
| colspan="6" | Two Democratic gains from Republican
|-

District 12 

Anthony Washington originally won a spot on the Democratic ticket in the general election but was replaced on the ballot by Robert P. Kurzydlowski.

District 13

District 14

District 15

District 16 

On election night, the returns initially showed incumbent Republican Donna Simon ahead of Democrat Andrew Zwicker. That night, Zwicker delivered a concession speech though later returns that night put him ahead of Simon. After all provisional ballots were counted in the four counties comprising the district, Simon conceded on November 16. Zwicker becomes the first Democrat to ever represent the 16th legislative district.

|- style="background-color:#FFFFFF" 
! style="background-color: #3333FF" | 
| colspan="6" | One Republican hold, one Democratic gain from Republican
|-

District 17

District 18

District 19 

Reyes Ortega originally won a spot on the Republican ticket in the general election but was replaced on the ballot by Jesus Varela.

District 20

District 21

District 22

District 23

District 24

District 25

District 26

District 27

District 28

District 29

District 30 

Jimmy Esposito originally won a spot on the Democratic ticket in the general election but was replaced on the ballot by Lorna Phillipson.

District 31

District 32

District 33

District 34 

Louis Rodriguez originally won a spot on the Republican ticket in the general election but withdrew his candidacy from the general election due to a federal job.

District 35

District 36

District 37

District 38 

Anthony Cappola initially dropped out of the race on October 1 following the discovery of a controversial satirical book entitled Outrageous! written by Cappola. Bergen County Republicans picked attorney Fernando Alonso to replace Cappola on the ballot pending the allowance of the replacement candidate on the ballot. The Republicans unexpectedly dropped the effort to have the candidate replaced on October 13 and Cappola later announced his intention to continue in the race.

District 39

District 40

Notes

References

New Jersey General Assembly elections
General
New Jersey